Serchhip District is one of the eleven districts of Mizoram state in India. The district occupies an area of 1421.60 km². Serchhip town is the administrative headquarters of the district. This district came into existence on 15 September 1998, being carved out of the larger Aizawl District. Because of the way it was created it includes part of East Lungdar Tehsil and part of Thingsulthliah Tehsil.

As of 2011 census, it has the highest literacy rate in India, and is the second least populous district of Mizoram (out of 8), after Saiha.

Geography
The district is bounded on the north and northwest by Aizawl District, on the west and south by Lunglei District, on the southeast by Myanmar (Burma), and on the east by Champhai District.

The district is mostly a hilly terrain with some alluvial benches along its rivers that are utilised for agriculture.  Serchhip District lies between the Mat River and the Tuikum River. The Tuikum
is utilised for public drinking water for the town of Serchhip and the Mat provides irrigation water to Zawlpui, considered the "rice bowl" of Serchhip.

With an average elevation , the average annual daily temperature ranges from 15 °C to 27 °C and the rainfall is moderate.

Administration and divisions
The district is administered by a deputy commissioner whose office is in the town of Serchhip. There are three sub-divisions (townships or tehsils)), Serchhip Sadar, North Vanlaiphai and Thenzawl, with forty-one villages.

There are three legislative assembly constituencies in this district: Tuikum, Hrangturzo and Serchhip.  Three
villages in Aizawl District are included in Tuikum Constituency, namely Darlawng, Phulmawi and Tlungvel. Hrangturzo Constituency includes the town of Biate which is located in Champhai District.

Major towns in this district are Serchhip, Thenzawl and North Vanlaiphai. The other sub-towns are Chhingchhip and East Lungdar. The notable villages include Hriangtlang and Lungpho.

Demographics

According to the 2011 census Serchhip district has a population of 64,937, roughly equal to the nation of Marshall Islands. This gives it a ranking of 626th in India (out of a total of 640). Approximately a third of the population live in and around the town of Serchhip. Its population growth rate over the decade 2001-2011 was  20.56%. Serchhip has a sex ratio of 977 females for every 1000 males, and a literacy rate of 97.91%. Most of the population is engaged in agricultural pursuits.

Flora and fauna
In 1991 the area became home to the Khawnglung Wildlife Sanctuary, which has an area of 35 km².

Notes and references

External links

 Serchhip district website
 
 

 
Districts of Mizoram
1998 establishments in Mizoram